Give the People What They Want may refer to:
"Give the People What They Want" (The O'Jays song), 1975
Give the People What They Want (The Kinks album), 1981
"Give the People What They Want" (The Kinks song)
Give the People What They Want (Sharon Jones & the Dap-Kings album), 2014
Give the People What We Want: Songs of The Kinks, a 2001 tribute album to music of The Kinks